Russian Canadians comprise Canadian citizens of Russian heritage or Russians who immigrated to and reside in Canada. According to the 2016 Census, there were 622,445 Canadians who claimed full or partial Russian ancestry.  The areas of Canada with the highest percentage population of Russian Canadians are the Prairie Provinces.

Number of Russian Canadians
Data from this section from Statistics Canada, 2016.

Data from this section from Statistics Canada, 2016.
 Total: 622,445.
 Single response: 120,165.
 Multiple response: 502,280.

Provinces and CMAs (census metropolitan areas) with Russian Canadian populations over 10,000

Quebec
Data in this section from Statistics Canada, 2016.
 Total: 55,230
 Single response: 15,800
 Multiple response: 39,435

Montréal (CMA)
Data in this section from Statistics Canada, 2016.
 Total: 49,275
 Single response: 14,315
 Multiple response: 34,960

Ontario
Data in this section from Statistics Canada, 2016.
 Total: 220,850
 Single response: 53,175
 Multiple response: 167,675

Toronto (CMA)
Data in this section from Statistics Canada, 2016.
 Total: 139,915
 Single response: 40,570
 Multiple response: 99,340

Ottawa-Gatineau (CMA - Ontario part)
Data in this section from Statistics Canada, 2016.
 Total: 15,620 (represents ~90% of total Ottawa-Gatineau CMA)
 Single response: 3,205
 Multiple response: 12,415

Manitoba
Data in this section from Statistics Canada, 2016.
 Total: 58,225
 Single response: 9,510
 Multiple response: 48,720

Winnipeg (CMA)
Data in this section from Statistics Canada, 2016.
 Total: 29,575
 Single response: 3,580
 Multiple response: 26,000

Saskatchewan
Data in this section from Statistics Canada, 2016.
 Total: 39,390
 Single response: 3,645
 Multiple response: 35,745

Saskatoon (CMA)
Data in this section from Statistics Canada, 2016.
 Total: 13,280
 Single response: 1,360
 Multiple response: 11,925

Alberta
Data in this section from Statistics Canada, 2016.
 Total: 107,800
 Single response: 14,320
 Multiple response: 93,480

Calgary (CMA)
Data in this section from Statistics Canada, 2016.
 Total: 37,955
 Single response: 6,125
 Multiple response: 31,830

Edmonton (CMA)
Data in this section from Statistics Canada, 2016.
 Total: 28,275
 Single response: 3,325
 Multiple response: 24,945

British Columbia
Data in this section from Statistics Canada, 2016.
 Total: 131,060
 Single response: 22,145
 Multiple response: 108,910

Vancouver (CMA)
Data in this section from Statistics Canada, 2016.
 Total: 58,535
 Single response: 11,145
 Multiple response: 47,395

Many British Columbians of Russian descent are Doukhobors, historically concentrated in the West Kootenay and Boundary Country regions.

List of notable Russian Canadians

Arts, entertainment and literature
Harvey Atkin – voice-over actor
Alex Battler – writer
Arnold Belkin – painter
Sasha Clements – actress, Majority Rules!
Ludmilla Chiriaeff – ballet dancer, choreographer and company director
Victor Garber – actor, Titanic, Argo, Star Trek
Natalie Glebova – Miss Universe 2005, Miss Universe Canada 2005
Anais Granofsky – actress, Degrassi Junior High
Michelle Gurevich – singer, formerly known as "Chinawoman"
Boris Hambourg – cellist
Melissa Hayden – ballet dancer
Jessica Parker Kennedy – actress, The Secret Circle, Smallville, Black Sails
Ezra Levant – media personality
Nadia Litz – actress
Elena Lobsanova – ballet dancer
George London – singer
Eli Mandel – poet
Catherine Manoukian – violinist
Niall Matter – actor, Eureka, Stargate Atlantis, Melrose Place, 90210
Sophie Milman – jazz musician
Zara Nelsova – cellist 
Alex Ozerov - actor
Kim Yaroshevskaya - actress, voice-over, story-teller and writer
Sarah Polley – actress and film director, Order of Canada
Dez Reed Panko - comedian, actor and writer
Duncan Regehr – writer and actor, Star Trek
Sasha Roiz – actor
Aleksei Serebryakov – actor
Elena Semikina – Miss Universe Canada 2010
Socalled – musician
Ksenia Solo – actress, Black Swan 
Madeline Sonik – writer
Jessica Trisko – Miss Earth 2007
Boris Volkoff - ballet master, choreographer, "the father of Canadian ballet"
Watts – produced for Method Man, Redman, and Snoop Dogg 
Adele Wiseman – author

Business and other
Bluma Appel – philanthropist, recipient of the Order of Canada and Order of Ontario
John Boyarski – recipient of awards for bravery
Charles Bronfman – billionaire, member of the Bronfman family
Edgar Bronfman, Sr. – billionaire, member of the Bronfman family
Saidye Rosner Bronfman – billionaire, member of the Bronfman family, founder of the Seagram Company
Samuel Bronfman – billionaire, member of the Bronfman family
Arcadi Gaydamak – businessman
Ben Hatskin – founder of the Winnipeg Jets
Gregory Lekhtman – inventor of exercise boots
Sonia Scurfield – owner of the Calgary Flames in the 1980s and 1990s
Alex Shnaider – co-founder of the Midland Group, partner in the Trump International Hotel and Tower (Toronto)

Politics
Grand Duchess Olga Alexandrovna of Russia – Russian Princess and youngest sister of Tsar Nicholas II of Russia
Alex Atamanenko – Member of Parliament in the House of Commons of Canada
Vasile Balabanov – Imperial Russian émigré
Martin Dobkin – mayor of Mississauga
Catherine Doherty – Imperial Russian émigré, social activist, recipient of the Order of Canada
Siegfried Enns – member of the House of Commons of Canada
Lois Hole – Lieutenant Governor of Alberta
George Ignatieff – Canadian diplomat
Michael Ignatieff – author, journalist, academic, politician
Ted Lipman – diplomat, ambassador to North Korea, and South Korea
Tom Nevakshonoff –  Member of the Legislative Assembly of Manitoba
Reynold Rapp – Member of the House of Commons of Canada
John Tory – mayor of Toronto 
Peter Vasilevich Verigin – Doukhobor leader
Pyotr Verzilov – activist
Roman Baber – Member of the Legislative Assembly of Ontario

Science
Gregory Chamitoff – NASA astronaut and engineer
Michel Chossudovsky – writer and professor of economics at the University of Ottawa
Andrew Donskov – professor of modern languages at the University of Ottawa; world-renowned Leo Tolstoy expert
Israel Halperin – mathematician
Martin Kamen – physicist, member of the Manhattan Project (first nuclear bomb); discovered the synthesis of the isotope carbon-14
Harry Medovy – pediatrician and academic, Order of Canada
Pierre Milman – mathematician, Fellow of the Royal Society of Canada
Sergei Plekhanov – Professor of Political Science at York University; former deputy director of the Institute for US and Canadian Studies in Russia
Louis Slotin – physicist, member of the Manhattan Project (first nuclear bomb)
George Volkoff, OC, MBE, FRSC – physicist who helped discover the existence of neutron stars
Leonid Ivanovich Strakhovsky - professor, pioneered Slavic studies at the University of Toronto

Sports
Nik Antropov – hockey player with the Toronto Maple Leafs (NHL) and the KHL
Ivan Babikov – Olympic cross-country skier
Artur Beterbiev – professional boxer
Patricia Bezzoubenko – rhythmic gymnast
Boris Blumin – chess grandmaster
Mark Bluvshtein – chess grandmaster
Debbie Brill – high-jumper
Édouard Carpentier – professional wrestler
Joshua Ho-Sang – hockey player with the OHL
Ron Cherkas – football
Mike Chernoff – ice hockey 
Rob Chernoff – swimmer
Tim Cheveldae – ice hockey
Kevin Cheveldayoff – ice hockey
Yelena Davydova – gymnastics
Shawn Horcoff – ice hockey
Igor Ivanov – chess grandmaster
Pete Knight – rodeo bronc rider
Lioudmila Kortchaguina – marathon runner
Jon-Lee Kootnekoff – basketball
Crazy Leo – rally driver
Andrei Markov – NHL hockey player
Olga Ovtchinnikova – Olympic fencer
Andrei Rogozine – world champion figure skater
Mikhail "Misha" Goikhberg – racing driver
Bobbie Rosenfeld – Olympic gold medalist
Pete Savenkoff – "Iron Man of Fastball"
Denis Shapovalov – tennis player
Igor Tikhomirov – Olympic champion in fencing
Marina Zoueva – ice dancing coach and choreographer

See also

European Canadians
Polish Canadians
Ukrainian Canadians

References

External links
 Simon Fraser University Digitized Newspapers website – digitized issues of Vestnik (Herald) newspaper, 1941–1993
 Richard A. Pierce – Russians in Canada

Canada–Russia relations
 
Ethnic groups in Canada
European Canadian
 
Asian Canadian